The Danish Culture Canon consists of 108 works of cultural excellence in eight categories: architecture, visual arts, design and crafts, film, literature, music, performing arts, and children's culture. An initiative of Brian Mikkelsen in 2004, it was developed by a series of committees under the auspices of the Danish Ministry of Culture in 2006–2007 as "a collection and presentation of the greatest, most important works of Denmark's cultural heritage." Each category contains 12 works although music contains 12 works of score music and 12 of popular music and the literature section's 12th item is an anthology of 24 works.

Architecture

The committee for architecture was asked to choose 12 works covering both buildings and landscaping. It was decided that works could either be in Denmark designed by one or more Danes or abroad designed by Danish architects. The committee consisted of: Lone Wiggers (chair), Carsten Juel-Christiansen, Malene Hauxner, Lars Juel Thiis and Kent Martinussen.

Visual arts 
The committee for visual arts decided that only works of artists who had completed their oeuvre could be included. They also decided that members of the committee could each select a work they especially appreciated. In this way the committee first selected seven works whereafter five members selected one work each. The committee consisted of Hein Heinsen (chair), Hans Edvard Nørregård-Nielsen, Bente Scavenius, Bjørn Nørgaard and Sophia Kalkau.

Design and crafts 

The committee for design and crafts decided that selection should be based on works with a useful function which were relevant at the time they were created while remaining recognizable today. They should also fall into an international perspective. The committee consisted of Merete Ahnfeldt-Mollerup (chair), Erik Magnussen, Astrid Krogh, Ursula Munch-Petersen and Louise Campbell.

Film 
In their selection, the committee for film focused on films reflecting Danish life with Danish actors. The included nevertheless the film Sult (Hunger) which takes place in Oslo and has Swedish actors. The committee consisted of Susanne Bier (chair), Vinca Wiedemann, Tivi Magnusson, Ole Michelsen and Jacob Neiiendam.

Literature 
The committee for literature found it important to select works with a quality which had been appreciated over time. The selected works were also considered to have made an important contribution both to Danish literature and to Danish culture in the widest sense. They reflect an original and bold artistic approach to works of value. They are worthy of being preserved for posterity as they serve as reference points in a modern global context. The committee consisted of Finn Hauberg Mortensen (chair), Erik A. Nielsen, Mette Winge, Claes Kastholm Hansen and Jens Christian Grøndahl.

The 12th item is an Anthology of lyrics consisting of the following 24 works:

Music 
The committee for music explained that, taking account of the wide range of Danish music, they gave focus to individual works rather than a composer's oeuvre. They presented two lists: one for what they called score music (classical), the other for popular music, although the two should be considered as a whole. The committee consisted of Per Erik Veng (chair), Jørgen I. Jensen, Torben Bille, Inger Sørensen and Henrik Marstal.

Classical music

The 12th item titled Højskolesange (Folk High School Songs) consists of the following 12 songs:

Popular music

The 12th item Evergreens is an anthology consisting of the following works:

Performing arts 

The committee for performing arts explained that their selection was based on works of unique creativity representing something new for their time while still remaining meaningful today. The committee consisted of Flemming Enevold (chair), Karen-Maria Bille, Jokum Rohde, Sonja Richter and Erik Aschengreen.

Children's canon 
The committee was formed spontaneously as work proceeded in the other areas. It is therefore not an independent selection as suggestions were received from all the other areas.

Impact
According to press reports, the canon has had limited impact and has been ineffective in its stated goal of fostering integration between the Danes and the immigrant communities. Berlingske pointed out, nevertheless, that the canon will remain a milestone as a non-socialist government had dared to "simply state that some works are better than others" and assert in that "this country may well be a modern society in a globalised world but that does not mean we have no merit as a nation or no right to national pride." Erik A. Nielsen, a member of the canon's literature committee, is not surprised the literature canon has had such limited effect, faced as it is with a "tsunami of international, strongly commercial cultural interests." He points out that the only reason his students take an interest in Danish culture is that "they have to take exams in it. If they are free to choose culture themselves, they go for films, rock music and a whole lot more that is essentially English or American in origin.

References

External links
"Kulturkanon", PDF Copy of the Website from 2006 
Danish Ministry of Culture: Kulturkanonen (English) PDF.

 
2004 establishments in Denmark